The British Mycological Society is a learned society established in 1896 to promote the study of fungi.

Formation

The British Mycological Society (BMS) was formed by the combined efforts of two local societies: the Woolhope Naturalists' Field Club of Hereford and the Yorkshire Naturalists’ Union. The Curator of the Hereford Club, Dr. H. G. Bull, convinced the members in 1867 to undertake the particular study of mushrooms. While the mycological efforts of the Club diminished somewhat after Dr. Bull's death, the Union of Yorkshire founded its  Mycological Committee in 1892. This Committee attracted the involvement of many eminent mycologists including George Edward Massee (1845–1917), James Needham (1849–1913), Charles Crossland (1844-1916), and Henry Thomas Soppitt (1843-1899). Mycologist Kathleen Sampson was a member for sixty years, as well as serving as president in 1938.

The need for a national organisation and the need for a journal to publish their observations led Cooke, Rea, Massee, and other mycologists (including Charles Crossland and  James Needham) to found the Society in 1896. The Society's founding officers were Rea (Secretary), Crossland (Treasurer), and Massee (President). The choice of the latter as President was based on his international reputation (with more than 250 mycological publications) and role as the mycologist at the Royal Botanical Gardens, Kew (where he replaced Cooke as mycologist in 1893). In 1897, Rea assumed the additional role of Treasurer, also continuing as Secretary (until 1918), and was also Editor (until 1930). However, Massee and a number of Yorkshire mycologists soon left the BMS, preferring to remain with the Yorkshire Naturalists' Union.

Membership
By 1903, the Society's Members numbered over a hundred, which had increased to over four hundred  (by shortly after World War II), and had reached over two thousand by 2006.

Before World War II, Honorary Membership was awarded to:
 1905		Émile Boudier (1828–1920) 
 1916 		Pier Andrea Saccardo (1845–1920) 
 1920 		Carleton Rea (1861–1946)
 1920 		Narcisse Théophile Patouillard (1854–1926)
 1924 		Gulielma Lister (1860-1949)

Publications
From 1896, the Society began publishing its annual journal, Transactions of the British Mycological Society (1896–1989), which became Mycological Research (1989–2010) and was renamed Fungal Biology (2010).

In 1967, the Society began publishing the Bulletin of the British Mycological Society (1967–87), which was renamed The Mycologist (1987–2007) and later became Fungal Biology Reviews (2007). A new journal was also launched entitled Fungal Ecology.

In 2000, the Society began publishing the quarterly journal, Field Mycology (2000) for the study and identification of wild fungi.

Periodically, the Society also publishes symposia in the British Mycological Society Symposium Series on a particular theme. The first was Genetics and Physiology of Aspergillus, edited by John E. Smith and John A. Pateman (1977), and there have been twenty-four symposia published as of 2006.
The BMS is also responsible for the management of the FRDBI (Fungal Records Database of Britain & Ireland). The FRDBI holds over 1.5m records and is a major resource for conservation and research purposes.

The Society also publishes many other items, from fine art prints to illustrated pocket identification guides, as well as a range of curriculum resources for teachers.

Activities
The Society's Mission Statement is to 'promote Fungal Science Internationally' with the objectives to:

 Encourage those interested in fungi and related organisms to join the Society and to take part in our events, whether in a professional or amateur capacity.
 Promote the recognition of fungal science in the UK and internationally.
 Support and grow the key areas of Society activities to promote further understanding of fungal science and to inspire future generations of mycologists.
 Support the Society's academic publications and other resources on fungal biology for the international community.
 Organise conferences, workshops and other activities supporting mycology.
 Promote networking across the fungal science community and maintain strong links with other relevant national and international learned societies and organisations.
 Ensure the Society's resources are utilised effectively to further fungal science.

Presidents

See also
Mycological Society of America
New York Mycological Society

References

External links

 Official webpage of the British Mycological Society
 "English names for fungi 2014" 

Learned societies of the United Kingdom
Scientific organisations based in the United Kingdom
 
Mycology organizations
British Mycological Society
1896 establishments in the United Kingdom
Organisations based in Manchester
Scientific organizations established in 1896